The members of the 29th Manitoba Legislature were elected in the Manitoba general election held in June 1969. The legislature sat from August 14, 1969, to May 25, 1973.

The New Democratic Party led by Edward Schreyer formed the government.

Walter Weir of the Progressive Conservative Party was Leader of the Opposition. Sidney Spivak became opposition leader after Weir retired as leader in 1971.

Ben Hanuschak served as speaker for the assembly until August 1970. Peter Fox succeeded Hanuschak as speaker in 1971.

There were five sessions of the 29th Legislature:

Richard Spink Bowles was Lieutenant Governor of Manitoba until September 2, 1970, when William John McKeag became lieutenant governor.

Members of the Assembly 
The following members were elected to the assembly in 1969:

Notes:

By-elections 
By-elections were held to replace members for various reasons:

Notes:

References 

Terms of the Manitoba Legislature
1969 establishments in Manitoba
1973 disestablishments in Manitoba